The  Little League World Series took place during August 21 through 23 in Williamsport, Pennsylvania. Industrial Little League of Monterrey, Nuevo León, Mexico, defeated Northern La Mesa Little League of La Mesa, California, in the championship game of the 11th Little League World Series. Ángel Macías threw the first and, to date, only perfect game in an LLWS championship.

This was the first LLWS to invite teams from qualifying regions: North, South, East, and West. Monterrey, representing the South region, became the first team from outside the United States or Canada to participate in a LLWS, and the first non-U.S. team to win a championship.

Industrial Little League of Monterrey 
In 1956, Monterrey was granted a Little League license. They assembled a four-team league consisting of teams from different factories, the Botelleros, Mineros, Tubitos, and Incas. Many of the kids came from low-income families and even worked in the factories themselves. Before the teams could play, they had to clear the field of rocks and broken glass. They even had to use homemade gloves and equipment. The league had a try out for a Little League team that would represent the city. The coach, Cesar Faz, recruited the kids. He became known as a great baseball coach and was considered one of the best at motivating a youth baseball team. After two exhibition games in Mexico the teams historic run to Williamsport began. However, they did not even know Williamsport existed. In July 1957, they took a bus to Reynosa, Mexico. From there, they crossed the border on foot. They walked on a bridge over the Rio Grande and continued to their hotel in McAllen. In McAllen, they played a U.S. subregional tournament. The team won their first game against a team from Mexico City, 9 to 2. They went on to defeat the McAllen All Stars, the Mission All Stars, the Weslaco All Stars, and the Western Brownsville All Stars to advance to a regional tournament in Corpus Christi. While there, they beat another team from Mexico City and then beat the Houston All Stars. The team then travelled to Fort Worth to play in the Texas State Tournament. Up until that point they had beat every team by five or more runs. However, in the state semifinals they needed extra innings to beat another Houston All Star team, 5 to 4. After they survived that game, they destroyed the Waco All Stars, 11 to 2 to advance to the South Regional. After the state tournament, the team got on a plane and flew to Louisville, Kentucky for the Southern Regionals. The winner of the Southern Regional was going to represent the south in the Little League World Series in Williamsport. Their first game was against Biloxi, Mississippi. They won that game 13 to 0. The next game, for the Southern Regional Championship, was against Owensboro, Kentucky. They won that game 3 to 0. The Monterrey Little League was headed to the Little League World Series. The team loaded up on to a bus and headed 700 miles northwest to Williamsport, Pennsylvania. Teams from Canada and Mexico had made it before, but they had never won the tournament or even reached the finals before.

Adversity 
During all this, their visas expired. The U.S. ambassador to Mexico had to intervene to keep them legally in the country. This allowed them to keep playing and keep winning. However, this did not solve all of their issues. They were travelling around the south during the 1950s. The team had to face racial injustice. They experienced Jim Crow laws. They were not allowed in to some places and even were refused service many of times. Something the never had to face in Mexico. The team was young, in a foreign country, and away from their families. Only one of the players had ever left Monterrey. Also, they did not have a lot of money for food. They were only able to eat two meals a day. It was only through the kindness of strangers and a few new friends who fed them, offered them meals at restaurants, and gave them some money after a win, that they were able to keep going.

Williamsport 
When they arrived in Williamsport, the Little League officials gave them new uniforms that said “South” across the chest. However, the uniforms did not fit because they were so much smaller than all the other teams. The boys from Monterrey averaged 4 feet 11 inches and 92 pounds. While the other teams average 5 feet 4 inches and 127 pounds. Unfazed, they beat Bridgeport, Connecticut, 2 to 1, to reach the championship game. They were set to face La Mesa, California, who easily beat Escanaba, Michigan. Many people believed that the boys from Monterrey had little chance to win.  Even some of the Monterrey players were questioning what would happen to them the next day. The coach, Cesar Faz, decided to name Angel Macias as the starting pitcher for the championship game. What he did that day led him to become known as “The Little Big Man”. He stood 5-feet tall and weighed 88-pounds. He was an ambidextrous pitcher. However, he decided to only throw with his right hand in this game. He was known to have a great fastball, but an even better curveball. The first batter, Lew Riley, hit a hard line drive down the first base line, on the first pitch of the game. It was foul by an inch. That was the closest La Mesa, California would come to a hit all afternoon. In front of ten thousand people and all the people listening in Mexico on the radio, Macias proceeded to be perfect. He did not allow a batter to get on a base. He struck out 11 out of the 18 batters he faced. No ball even left the infield. With two outs in the 6th inning, La Mesa's Bryon Haggard stepped into the box. Macias quickly fell behind in the count 3-0. He proceeded to battle back and threw two strikes to make the count full. Macias then winded up and threw a curveball that made Haggard swing and miss. The crowd exploded. Macias had done what no one else had done before. He had thrown a perfect game in the LLWS championship game. However, no one on the team even knew what a perfect game was. The team from Monterrey had made history, they became the first team from outside the United States to win the Little League World Series.

Aftermath 
The next morning, the story was getting national and international coverage and attention. Newspaper and News station could not stop talking about the team from Monterrey. After they won the Little League World Series, the team's first thought was to go home. However, it would be almost a month until the team returned to Monterrey. They began their victory tour by traveling by bus to New York City. While they were there, the Brooklyn Dodgers invited them to be their guest at Ebbets Field. The team then went shopping at Macy's Department Store and were each given $40 dollars to spend. After leaving New York, the team headed to Washington D.C. While they were there, they met with President Dwight Eisenhower, Vice President Richard Nixon, and future president Lyndon B. Johnson. The team then travelled to Mexico City. The team met with Mexican President Ruiz Cortinez and attended celebrations. They were considered national heroes. The team then flew from Mexico City to their hometown of Monterrey. When they arrived, they were met with tens of thousands of people in the streets. A parade was organized for the team. It started at the airport and stretched to the Government Palace. During the parade, people were trying to take parts part of their uniforms, hats, belts, cleats as memorabilia and souvenirs. After the parade, the Mexican Government awarded all 14 members of the team a scholarship for both high school and college education. However, only two of them ever actually went to college. According to a few of the players, everywhere they went people recognized them and wanted autographs. The team also went on to win the championship in 1958 as well. As the kids grew up, they all went their separate ways. Angel Macias was signed by The Los Angeles Angels of Anaheim at the age of 16. He was invited to their spring training in 1961. He played for a couple of years as an outfielder in the minor leagues. He advanced as far as the Class A California League. Macis then went on to have a twelve-year career in the Mexican League, where he played for the Leon Broncos, Broncos de Reynosa, and the Monterrey Sultanes. After his playing career, he ran the Mexican Academy, which is a minor league circuit. He was inducted into Little League Hall of Excellence in 2017. One of the other players, Jose “Pepe” Maiz, also was inducted in 2005. Him and Macis did a lot for the growth of baseball in Mexico. Maiz also runs a construction company and owns the Monterrey Sultanes. There were even two movies were made about the story of the 1957 Monterrey Little League's historic run. A 1960 Mexican production called “Los Pequeños Gigantes” and a 2009 film called “The Perfect Game”. Episode 296 of the Futility Closet podcast covers the team and their Little League World Series championship.

Teams

Championship bracket 
California's first game was played a day later than planned, due to illness within the team, resulting in the third-place game also being delayed a day.

References

External links 
1957 Little League World Series
Line scores for the 1957 LLWS

Little League World Series
Little League World Series
Little League World Series